Mirjana Škorić (born 8 July 1970), better known as Mira Škorić, is a Serbian pop-folk singer and television personality, considered to be one of the best Serbian singers of all time, alongside singers such as Marija Šerifović with her very strong vocal abilities.

Life and career
Born on July 8, 1970 in Belgrade, she gained popularity in the 1990s and is best known for her hits like "Otkači" (Loosen Up) and "Manastir" (Monastery) from the 1993 album Ti si ko i ja. Throughout her career, Škorić has also collaborated with some of the biggest regional singers such as Ceca, Lepa Brena, Vesna Zmijanac, Aca Lukas, Željko Bebek and Ana Bekuta. In October 2019, she marked over three decades of her career with a concert at Belgrade's Sava Centar. Same year she also received the Life Achievement Award for her work from the Union of Serbia's Music Artists. 

Beyond her music career, Škorić has also appeared in several reality TV show, such as Veliki Brat VIP All Stars (2009) and Parovi (2015). In 2017, she served as a contestant on the fourth season of Serbian spin-off of Your Face Sounds Familiar. She also assisted Jelena Karleuša as a mentor on the singing competition Zvezde Granda.

Škorić has a daughter, Milica, who she raised as a single parent.

Discography 
Studio albums
 Niko kao mi (1988)
 Mi možemo sve (1989)
 Oči moje ponosite (1991)
 Imam želju (1992)
 Ti si ko i ja (1993)
 Rodiću ti sina (1995)
 U službi ljubavi (1996)
 Kosa crna (1997)
 Srcekradica (1998)
 10 (2000)
 Kafano! (2001)
 Još uvek te volim (2003)
 Najbolji prijatelji (2005)
 Za moj rođendan (2013)

Television appearances

References

External links
 

1970 births
Living people
21st-century Serbian women singers
Serbian folk-pop singers
Singers from Belgrade
Beovizija contestants